James Stuart Tanton (born August 1, 1966) is a mathematician and math educator. He is a winner of the Kidder Faculty Prize for his teaching at The St. Mark’s Math Institute, scholar at the Mathematical Association of America, author of over ten books on mathematics, curriculum, and education, and creator of videos on mathematics on YouTube. As of February 2020 his approximately 190 videos had earned over 800,000 views.

Education and professional work
Tanton received his B.A. in mathematics from the University of Adelaide, and he earned his Ph.D. in mathematics from Princeton University in 1994, with a thesis in algebraic topology titled A Homological Fibration for Gl [infinity]. He taught at the New College, St. Mary's College of Maryland, and Merrimack College before deciding that, to gain credibility with the high school teachers he hoped to work with, he had to teach high school himself. Tanton taught at St. Mark’s School in Southborough, Massachusetts, from 2002 to 2011. 

As a presenter working with Maths Week Ireland, Tanton has worked to create interest in mathematics in schools in both parts of Ireland. Currently he is a visiting scholar at the Mathematical Association of America in Washington, DC.

Selected awards and honors
 MathMovesU Math Hero Award for mathematics middle and high school teaching, sponsored by Raytheon Company, 2010
 The Kidder Faculty Prize for teaching at St. Mark’s School, 2006 
 The Mathematical Association of America's Beckenback Book Prize for Solve This: Mathematical Activities for Students and Clubs, 2005 
 The Mathematical Association of America's Trevor Evans Award for distinguished writing in both 2001 and 2002
 Homer L. Dodge Award for college teaching excellence at The St. Mary’s College of Maryland, 1999 
 Princeton University Engineering Council Teaching Award, for teaching excellence, 1994

Selected books by Tanton
Mathematics Galore: The First Five Years of the St. Mark’s Institute of Mathematics, Mathematical Association of America, 2012
The Encyclopedia of Mathematics, Facts on File.2005. 
Solve This: Mathematical Activities for Students and Clubs, Mathematical Association of America, 2001.

Self-published texts and curricular material
THINKING MATHEMATICS! series:
 Volume 1: Arithmetic = Gateway to All
 Volume 2: Advanced Counting and Advanced Algebra Systems
 Volume 3: Lines, Circles, Trigonometry and Conics
 Volume 4: Functions and their Graphs 
 Volume 5: e, i, pi and all that! 
 Volume 6: Calculus 
GEOMETRY: Volume I and GEOMETRY: Volume 2
MATH WITHOUT WORDS
MATHEMATICAL THINKING: Numbers and their Algebra  (An advanced course for middle-school students and their teachers.)

References

External links
 Thinking Mathematics! James Tanton's Personal Website
 "Weird Ways to Work with Pi" article and presentation by James Tanton

1966 births
Living people
Mathematics educators
Mathematics popularizers
Princeton University alumni
University of Adelaide alumni
Mathematics writers